Lardu (also Romanized as Lardū) is a village in Takht Rural District, Takht District, Bandar Abbas County, Hormozgan Province, Iran. At the 2006 census, its population was 128, in 25 families.

References 

Populated places in Bandar Abbas County